Ben Becker (born 19 December 1964) is a German film, theatre and voice actor.

Biography 
Becker was born in Bremen, the son of actress Monika Hansen and actor Rolf Becker. He is the brother of actress Meret Becker and the stepson of Otto Sander. His grandmother was the comedian Claire Schlichting. Becker is Jewish through his maternal grandmother Claire Schlichting's father who was a Jewish merchant from Wuppertal.

As a child, Becker participated in radio dramas and had several small roles in films. Between 1985 and 1987 he trained as an actor in the Berliner Schaubühne theatre. His first contract was with Ernst Deutsch Theater in Hamburg. Later he joined the Staatstheater Stuttgart (Stuttgart State Theatre), where he was mostly remembered for his role (1991–1992) as Ferdinand in Schiller's Intrigue and Love. Later, he worked with the Düsseldorfer Schauspielhaus, and played the role of Tybalt in Shakespeare's Romeo and Juliet in the Deutschen Schauspielhaus in Hamburg.

His first memorable role in cinema was in 1991, in the film , where he played the role of the arrogant German boyfriend of the pregnant Serbian heroine. His big break was in 1995 as Peter, who fell in love with a man, in Joseph Vilsmaier's Schlafes Bruder. In the film Comedian Harmonists he played the singer .

In 1995 he created his own production of Sid & Nancy with his sister Meret in the main role. Becker appeared in Rosa von Praunheim's film The Einstein of Sex (1999).  In 1999 he played the main role in the Maxim-Gorki-Theater's production of Alfred Döblin's Berlin Alexanderplatz. In 2005 he played in the unique film, which consisted of a monologue.

Becker is also involved in music and owns a pub, the Trompete, in Berlin/Tiergarten. He has one daughter, Lilith (born in 2000).

In 2008 Becker worked with the German band Schiller (thus following in the footsteps of his stepfather Otto Sander), where Ben did spoken lyrics for the album Sehnsucht. One song is called "Nacht",  a video of which can be seen on YouTube. The lyrics are a shortened version of a poem in German called Die Seele that is attributed to Lord Byron. It appears to be a translation of the Byron poem, "When coldness wraps this suffering clay" s:When coldness wraps this suffering clay from the collection, Hebrew Melodies. The identity of the translator/author of Die Seele is unknown although the text may be from "Lord Byrons Werke In sechs Bänden" translated by Otto Gildemeister,  3rd Volume, Fifth Edition, Berlin 1903 (pages 134-135).

Selected filmography

Awards 
1997 Bavarian Film Award, Special Prize

References

External links 

1964 births
Living people
Actors from Bremen
German people of Jewish descent
German male film actors